Jamjodhpur is one of the 182 Legislative Assembly constituencies of Gujarat state in India. It is part of Jamnagar district.

List of segments
This assembly seat represents the following segments,

 Jamjodhpur Taluka
 Lalpur Taluka
Bhanvad Taluka (Part) Villages – Manpar, Jogra, Chokhanda, Bhangol, Bhoria, Kabarka, Shedhakhai, Bodki, Fotdi, Dharagar, Krushnagadh, Vanavad, Katkola

Members of Legislative Assembly
2007 - Brijrajsinh Jadeja, Indian National Congress
2012- Chimanbhai Shapriya, Bharatiya Janata Party
2017 - Kalariya Chiragbhai Rameshbhai Indian National Congress
2022- Ahir Hemantbhai Hardasbhai, Aam Aadmi Party

Election results

2022

2017

2012

See also
 List of constituencies of the Gujarat Legislative Assembly
 Jamnagar district

References

External links
 

Assembly constituencies of Gujarat
Jamnagar district